Neofytos Michael (Greek: Νεόφυτος Μιχαήλ, born 16 December 1993) is a Cypriot professional footballer who plays as a goalkeeper for Cyprus First Division club Anorthosis Famagusta and the Cyprus national team.

Club career

Anorthosis Famagusta
On 24 June 2022, Michael signed with Cypriot First Division club Anorthosis Famagusta on a two-year contract until 2024.

Career statistics

International career
Michael was called up to the senior Cyprus squad for a friendly against Serbia in May 2016.

He made his debut on 19 November 2019 in a Euro 2020 qualifier against Belgium, which ended in 1–6 loss for Cyprus.

References

External links
 
 
 https://web.archive.org/web/20170608071153/http://www.cfacup.com.cy/Gr/players/2282030/178036
 https://web.archive.org/web/20170701075032/http://backend.cfa.com.cy/Gr/players/1389851/142128
 https://web.archive.org/web/20170202002456/http://backend.cfa.com.cy/Gr/players/1376799/153743

1993 births
Living people
Cypriot footballers
Cyprus international footballers
Olympiakos Nicosia players
ENTHOI Lakatamia FC players
Nea Salamis Famagusta FC players
APOEL FC players
Aris Limassol FC players
PAS Giannina F.C. players
Cypriot First Division players
Association football goalkeepers